Badel is a small village in Somalia. In 2007, it was the target of an attack on al-Qaeda by American forces.

References

Populated places in Somalia
Airstrikes